Sengge Namgyal (Sen-ge-rnam-rgyal, c. 1570–1642) was a 17th-century Namgyal dynasty King of Ladakh, from 1616 to his death in 1642. A Buddhist, he was noted for his immense work in building monasteries, palaces and shrines in Ladakh and is known as the "Lion King".

Biography

Sengge was born to Jamyang Namgyal and a Balti mother, Gyal Khatun. He was a devout Buddhist.

In his youth, he showed great martial skill and a flair for command. Talents which got him the command of the army. In 1614, he captured the mining town of Rudok followed by Spurangs, another important gold mining town, in 1615. The plunder and the output from these towns financed the building projects he would later commission as the King. In 1616, on the death of his father, Jamyang Namgyal, he ascended to the throne. He completed the conquests of Kingdom of Ngaris after a brief siege of Guge castle (Tsaparang) in 1619.

References

External links
More on Namgyal and Leh Palace

Kings of Ladakh
1642 deaths
Year of birth unknown
Year of birth uncertain